The Kalika Purana, also called the Kali Purana, Sati Purana or Kalika Tantra, is one of the eighteen minor Puranas (Upapurana) in the Shaktism tradition of Hinduism. The text was likely composed in Assam or Cooch Behar
region of India and is attributed to the sage Markandeya. It exists in many versions, variously organized in 90 to 93 chapters. The surviving versions of the text are unusual in that they start abruptly and follow a format not found in either the major or minor Purana-genre mythical texts of Hinduism. Various types of animal sacrifices for devi are detailed in the Purana.

Content 
The text starts off with the legends of Devi trying to bring Shiva back from ascetic life into that of a householder's by making him fall in love again. According to Ludo Rocher, Markandeya describes how Brahma, Shiva and Vishnu are "one and the same" and that all goddesses (Sati, Parvati, Menaka, Kali and others) are manifestation of the same feminine energy. It glorifies the goddess Kamakhya, or Kamakshi, and details the ritual procedures required for worshiping her. It also describes in detail the rivers and mountains at Kamarupa tirtha and mentions the Brahmaputra River and the Kamakhya Temple.

Rudhiradhyaya 
Chapters 67 through 78 of the text constitute the Rudhiradhyaya which discusses bali (animal sacrifice) and of Vamacara Tantrism. The Rudhiradhyaya section is notable for its uncommon discussion of human sacrifice. The text states that a human sacrifice may be performed to please the goddess, but only with the consent of prince before a war or cases of imminent danger. The text also states that anyone who is physically disabled, related to a Brahmin, or "is not willing to die" through the sacrifice is unfit for the ritual. The text describes the rituals associated with a bali, or a rice-paste substitute for enemies prior to a war, but does not describe how the sacrifice was actually done.

History 
The work  belongs to the goddess-oriented Shakta branch of Hinduism. Most probably it was composed in or near medieval Kamarupa (modern Assam). It is a late work, states Hazra, by Nibandha writers regarding Shakti worship. It is also one of the rare Hindu texts that actually mentions the word "Hindu".

Date 
According to Hazra, there existed a text that was older than the extant one, and that the origin of that text was Bengal. This is denied by Shastri, who claims that the evidence provided by Hazra for an earlier text can be explained by other means, without invoking an older text. According to Shastri, the local descriptions; the exposition of the myth of Naraka from who all the dynasties of Kamarupa drew their lineage; the description of the myth of Brahmaputra river; and the claim in the text that Kamarupa was holier than even Varanasi points to the text having been composed in Kamarupa.

References to Kālidāsa and Magha suggests that it is not one of the early Puranas. The mention of places and events associated with Ratna Pala (920-960) of Kamrupa region places the text to after the 10th-century. The explanation in the text for the Mlechchha population, and the indication of a parallel explanation in Harjaravarman's (815-832) Hyunthal copper plate inscription places the text closer to his reign. According to Rocher, the mention of king Dharmapala of Kamarupa has led to proposals of Kalika Purana being an 11th or 12th-century text. However, estimates for different sections of the text range from 7th to the 12th-century.

Printed editions 
The earliest printed edition of this text was published by the Venkateshvara Press, Bombay in 1829 Saka Era (1907 CE), followed by the Vangavasi Press, Calcutta in 1316 Bangabda (1909 CE).

References

Bibliography 

 
 
 
 
 
 \

External links 
Contents of 18 Puranas and a list of Upapuranas (lesser Puranas)

Puranas
Shaktism
Animal sacrifice
Human sacrifice